Mosquito Creek is a stream in the U.S. state of South Dakota.

Mosquito Creek derives its name not from the mosquito, but from a Sioux Indian.

See also
List of rivers of South Dakota

References

Rivers of Charles Mix County, South Dakota
Rivers of South Dakota